Aguarunichthys inpai, is a species of benthopelagic catfish of the family Pimelodidae that is native to middle Amazon River basin of Brazil.

It grows to a length of 42.0 cm.

Head broad and depressed. Eyes smaller than other species. Snout broad. Anterior nostril tubular and directed forward. Mouth  distinctly subterminal with a developed upper lip. Body cream colored, with several round brown spots. Broad transversal unpigmented stripe present on dorsum. Dorsal fin yellowish white  with small dark spots on the spine. Pectoral fin brownish grey dorsally, with small dark spots. Caudal fin is whitish and unpigmented.

References

Pimelodidae
Catfish of South America
Freshwater fish of Brazil
Taxa named by Jansen Alfredo Sampaio Zuanon 
Taxa named by Lúcia Helena Rapp Py-Daniel
Taxa named by Michel Louis Arthur Marie Ange François Jégu
Fish described in 1993